I124 or I-124 may refer to:

 Interstate 124, a short segment of a four-lane limited access highway
 Iodine-124 (I-124 or 124I), a radioactive isotope of iodine
 Japanese submarine I-124, an I-121 class submarine of the Imperial Japanese Navy